Edward Hume (25 September 1841 – 24 October 1921) was an English first-class cricketer.

The son of William Wheeler Hume, he was born in September 1841 at Scaldwell, Northamptonshire. He was educated at Marlborough College, where he was coached in cricket by Robert Carpenter.

Matriculating at Trinity College, Oxford in 1860, Hume graduated B.A. in 1863. While studying at Oxford, he made his debut in first-class cricket for Oxford University against the Marylebone Cricket Club (MCC) at Oxford in 1861. He played first-class cricket for Oxford until 1863, making six appearances and scoring 74 runs, with a high score of 21. 

Then admitted to Lincoln's Inn, Hume was called to the bar in 1867. In the same year that he was called to the bar, he also made a first-class appearance for the MCC, against Oxford University at Lord's. Hume made a final first-class appearance in 1879 for the Gentlemen of England against the Gentlemen of Kent at Canterbury. He served on the committee of the MCC from 1881–85 and was an examiner of the High Court from 1884. Hume died at Totland Bay on the Isle of Wight in October 1921.

References

External links

1841 births
1921 deaths
People from West Northamptonshire District
People educated at Marlborough College
Alumni of Trinity College, Oxford
English cricketers
Oxford University cricketers
Members of Lincoln's Inn
English barristers
Marylebone Cricket Club cricketers
Gentlemen of England cricketers
English cricket administrators